Daigoro Timoncini (born 13 December 1985 in Faenza, Ravenna) is an Italian Greco-Roman wrestler. He is also a two-time Olympian, and a six-time Italian national wrestling champion for the heavyweight category.

Timoncini qualified for the 96-kg category in men's Greco-Roman wrestling at the 2008 Summer Olympics in Beijing, after placing fifth at the 2007 World Championships in Baku, Azerbaijan. He first defeated Japan's Kenzo Kato in the qualifying round, but lost to Russia's Aslanbek Khushtov in the second round, without receiving a technical score. Because his second opponent advanced further into the final match, Timoncini automatically qualified for the first repechage bout, where he was defeated by Kazakhstan's Asset Mambetov, who scored a double reversed exposure for the entire period, finishing in tenth place.

At his second Olympics in London, Timoncini improved his tactics and strategy in men's heavyweight division. However, he was eliminated in the first round, after being defeated by Armenia's Artur Aleksanyan, who eventually won the bronze medal in this event. Timoncini finished in eighteenth place.

References

External links 
Profile – CONI 
NBC Olympic Profile

1985 births
Living people
Wrestlers at the 2008 Summer Olympics
Wrestlers at the 2012 Summer Olympics
Wrestlers at the 2016 Summer Olympics
Olympic wrestlers of Italy
People from Faenza
Sportspeople from the Province of Ravenna
Italian male sport wrestlers
Wrestlers at the 2015 European Games
European Games competitors for Italy
Mediterranean Games bronze medalists for Italy
Mediterranean Games medalists in wrestling
Competitors at the 2013 Mediterranean Games
European Wrestling Championships medalists
20th-century Italian people
21st-century Italian people